Dugesia golanica is a species of dugesiid triclad that inhabits freshwater bodies of Israel. The species is named after the Golan Heights.

References

Golanica
Animals described in 1991
Endemic fauna of Israel
Invertebrates of Israel